North Dakota Highway 21 (ND 21) is an east-west highway in North Dakota. The highway is known for the large number of abandonments located along it.

History 
The current ND-24 segment between ND-6 and the current ND-24/ND-1806 junction was originally part of ND-21. This segment was renumbered between 1950 and 1963.

Major intersections

Notes

External links

 The North Dakota Highways Page by Chris Geelhart
 North Dakota Signs by Mark O'Neil

021
Transportation in Morton County, North Dakota
Transportation in Grant County, North Dakota
Transportation in Hettinger County, North Dakota
Transportation in Slope County, North Dakota